Laurie A. Saletnik is a registered nurse. She is the Senior Director of Nursing for Perioperative Services at Johns Hopkins Hospital and has served as Editor‐in‐Chief for the Association of periOperative Registered Nurses journal AORN since 2017.

References

Living people
Johns Hopkins University faculty
American women nurses
Year of birth missing (living people)
American women academics
21st-century American women